Ketovalerate may refer to:

 α-Ketovalerate (α-ketovaleric acid)
 β-Ketovalerate (3-oxopentanoic acid)
 γ-Ketovalerate (levulinic acid)